Lalith J. Rao (also spelt Lalit) (born 6 November 1942) is an Indian classical singer and a representative of the Agra gharana (singing style).

Early life
Rao's introduction to classical music was at the age of three, at a concert by the Agra gharana vocalist Faiyaz Khan. She started learning music from Rama Rao Naik, who initiated her into the Agra gharana. Rao's first public concert was at the Bangalore Sangeet Sabha at the age of 12. When she was 14, she won the All India Classical Music competition in Mumbai and became the youngest participant of the Swami Haridas Sangeet Sammelan the same year.

Rao completed her Bachelors and Masters in Electrical Communication Engineering, the latter from the University of New Brunswick. In 1967, she married Jayavanth Rao and moved to Delhi to work. Her husband convinced Rao to abandon her engineering career and pursue singing, and she received training from Dinkar Kaikini and later from Khadim Hussain Khan.

Singing career
Rao went back to the Sur Singar Sansad to restart her performance career and became a professional singer after a positive reception. She is as adept at singing khyal, dhrupad, dhamar, as well as thumri, tarana and hori.

Her first concert abroad was in 1981. She has performed in France, UK, US and Canada and is a top-grade artiste of All India Radio. Rao regularly performs on the Radio and Television.

Rao was one of the key figures in setting up a trust "Sajan Milap" in the mid-seventies, to popularise the music of her Ustad, who used the pen name "Sajan Piya". She was the chief coordinator for the Ford Foundation Archival project at the ITC Sangeet Research Academy from 1989–91. Few years later she herself sang for the Ethno-Musicology Department of the University of Washington in Seattle. for them to archive the music of her Agra gharana.

Rao lives and teaches music in Bangalore. Bharathi Prathap, Manohar Patwardhan, Kailash Kulkarni, Pratima Bellave are some of her notable disciples.

Notable performances
Sawai Gandharva Bhimsen Mahotsav in Pune, Hubli and Kundgol
ITC-SRA Sangeet Sammelan in New Delhi, Agra, Jaipur, Jodhpur and other places
Tansen Samaroh in Gwalior
Vishnu Digambar Jayanti Utsav in Delhi
Swami Haridas Sangeet Sammelan in Mumbai, Delhi, Mathura and Vrindavan
Gunidas Sangeet Sammelan in Mumbai, Delhi and Bengaluru
Music Circles and Sangeet Sabhas throughout the length and breadth of India
Several successful concert tours of USA, Canada, UK, France and Switzerland.

Awards and recognitions 
Sangeet Natak Akademi Award: Government of India, 2018
Karnataka Rajyotsava Award Rajyotsava Prashasti: Government of Karnataka, 2017
Karnataka Sangeet Nritya Academy Gaurava Puraskar
Karnataka Kalashree: Government of Karnataka 2011-2012
Tana Riri award from the Gujarat State Sangeet Natak Akademi for lifetime achievement 2016
Nishagandhi Puraskaram by the Government of Kerala 2014
"Sur Mani": Sur Singar Sansad
Lifetime Achievement award from Bangalore Gayana Samaja
Lifetime Achievement Award: Puttaraj Samman
BKF Mallikarjun Mansur Award 2014
Ganakala Tapaswini by Srimad Vadiraja Aradhana Trust for life-time achievement in Hindustani Classical Music 2016
Swaratapasvi by Swara Sankula, Mysore

Partial discography
Bihag; Kedar; Thumri(1986) HMV PSLP 1373
Beyond Reach: Ragas Durga & Pilu (2003)
Raga Darbari Kanhada, Raga Desh (2006)
Raga Lalit (2002)
Ragas Kalyan Nat & Adana (2002)
Raga Shree (2013)
Ragas Dhanashree & Barwa (2013)
Ragas Gorakh Kalyan & Basant (2013)

References

External links

Gangubai Hanagal presenting 'Puttaraj Samman' to vocalist Lalith J. Rao in Hubli. 
2003 Interview 
Nishagandhi Puraskar 2014 by Govt. of Kerala 
Interview by Sahapedia 
Agra Gharana 

1942 births
Hindustani singers
Living people
Singers from Bangalore
University of New Brunswick alumni
Agra gharana
Indian women classical singers
20th-century Indian singers
Women Hindustani musicians
Engineers from Karnataka
Indian women engineers
Indian electrical engineers
21st-century Indian women singers
Women scientists from Karnataka
Women musicians from Karnataka
20th-century Indian women singers
21st-century Indian singers
21st-century women engineers
20th-century Khyal singers
Recipients of the Sangeet Natak Akademi Award